Tony Crook may refer to:

 Tony Crook (politician) (born 1959), Australian politician
 Tony Crook (racing driver) (1920–2014), English racing driver
 Tony Crook (academic), British academic and emeritus professor of town and regional planning